Sbrodovo is a rural locality (a village) in Sukhonskoye Rural Settlement, Mezhdurechensky District, Vologda Oblast, Russia. The population was 30 as of 2002.

Geography 
Sbrodovo is located 10 km southeast of Shuyskoye (the district's administrative centre) by road. Vragovo is the nearest rural locality.

References 

Rural localities in Mezhdurechensky District, Vologda Oblast